Red Sky is the third album by American jazz trio Moon Hooch, released on June 10, 2016 by Hornblow/Palmetto Records.

Track listing
All songs composed by Moon Hooch.

Personnel
Moon Hooch
James Muschler - drums, tabla, synthesizers
Michael Wilbur - tenor saxophone, soprano saxophone, synthesizers, bass saxophone, vocals
Wenzl McGowen - tenor saxophone, baritone saxophone, contrabass clarinet, synthesizers

References

2016 albums
Moon Hooch albums
Palmetto Records albums